Miss United Kingdom is a title held by the highest-ranked contestant from the UK in the Miss World pageant. The winner sometimes competes at Miss International the following year under the Britain or United Kingdom banner. From 1958 to 1999, Miss United Kingdom was a national beauty pageant held to choose a representative for the Miss World Pageant. In 1999, Scotland and Wales had their own contestants at Miss World, and in 2000, England and Northern Ireland sent their own representatives. The existing organization now runs the Miss England competition.

History

The pageant was created in 1958 by Eric Morley, the man behind the Miss World pageant. Before 1958, the winner of the Miss Great Britain contest would go on to represent the UK at the Miss World pageant, but from 1952 to 1957, none of the Miss GB title holders made the final seven at Miss World, so Morley decided to create the Miss United Kingdom contest in the hope of achieving better results at Miss World. From 1958 to 1999, the winner of Miss United Kingdom title would represent the UK at Miss World.

At Miss United Kingdom, traditionally there would be regional heats from the four constituent Countries of the United Kingdom, these would take place early in the year. The winners of the respective Miss England, Miss Scotland and Miss Wales titles would compete in the summer at Miss Universe. The Miss UK contest would then take place featuring these titleholders plus a certain number of other top contestants from the regions, the winner would then go on to compete at the Miss World Contest in October/November. This meant that during the 60s, 70s and 80s, many British beauty queens competed at both the Miss Universe and Miss World contests.

Although England, Scotland, Wales and Northern Ireland have had separate representatives in other international pageants, Miss World did not allow this until the creation of separate Parliaments in the United Kingdom.

1999 was the year of the last Miss United Kingdom pageant, won by Nicola Willoughby, who competed as Miss UK at Miss World (the final woman to do so). The 1999 Miss World contest also saw the debuts of Scotland (represented by Stephanie Norrie) and Wales (represented by Clare Marie Daniels), so there was the unusual situation of having a Miss UK compete alongside Miss Scotland and Miss Wales.  The following year, Julie Lee-Ann Martin became the first representative of Northern Ireland in the pageant while Michelle Walker was the first to compete as Miss England.

Since 2000, the Miss World Organization has announced the highest-ranking delegate of the four home nations at Miss World, as the winner of the Miss United Kingdom title. The winner receives a cash prize and has often represented the United Kingdom at the Miss International contest the following year. Since 2000, Scotland has the most Miss United Kingdom winners with (9), followed by England (4), Wales (3) and Northern Ireland (3).

Winners

From 2000 to present

From 1958 to 1999

 Real name Diane Hickingbotham
 Also known as Carolyn Grant

United Kingdom in international pageants

Miss World
From 1952 to 1957 the UK were represented by the winner of the Miss Great Britain pageant. At the first Miss World in 1951, 21 of the 26 contestants were from the UK, including those that placed as first runner-up and second runner-up. From 1958 to 1999 the winner of the Miss United Kingdom pageant competed. There have been five UK winners of the Miss World title; all won the title competing as Miss United Kingdom.

Miss Universe
The first UK contestant was Aileen Chase, who competed at the first Miss Universe in 1952 as Miss Great Britain. From 1955 to 1990 Miss England would compete, joined (from 1961 to 1990) By Miss Scotland and Miss Wales; many of these contestants would go on to compete at (and win) the Miss United Kingdom contest later in the year. The Miss World organisation held the franchise. The 1990s and 21st century have returned to one contestant competing as Miss United Kingdom or Miss Great Britain. Since 2005 the UK has been represented by the winner of the Miss Universe GB pageant. No woman from the United Kingdom has ever won Miss Universe.

Miss International

Miss Europe
The UK started sending representatives to the Miss Europe contest in 1929. From 1929-1936, the winner of Miss England competed at Miss Europe. The UK did not send any representatives in 1937 but returned in 1938, it is unknown how the representative was determined in 1938. In 1933, a representative from Scotland was also sent. The Miss Europe contest stopped after 1938 due to World War II but returned after the war in 1948. In 1948 & 1949, the winner of Miss Great Britain competed at Miss Europe. The UK did not compete in 1950 and there was no contest in 1951. In 1952, both the contest and the UK returned. It is unknown how that year's representative was chosen. From 1953 to 1969, Miss England sent delegates to compete at Miss Europe and that was the only UK representative at the pageant. Starting in 1970, the UK's representation was from Miss England, Miss Scotland & Miss Wales, this lasted until 1997. Starting in 1999, there was only one UK representative and they competed as Great Britain (with the exception of 2003 & 2005, 2003 competed as United Kingdom and 2005 competed as England).

Hosts

See also 
 Miss England
 Miss Northern Ireland
 Miss Scotland
 Miss Wales
 Miss Great Britain
 Miss Universe Great Britain

References

 
Lists of British women
United Kingdom
1958 establishments in the United Kingdom
Annual events in the United Kingdom
British awards